Bozdoğan usually refers to the district in Aydın Province, Turkey, but may also refer to the following places:

 Bozdoğan, Alaca
 Bozdoğan, Anamur, a village in Anamur district of Mersin Province, Turkey
 Bozdoğan, Mut, a village in Mut district of Mersin Province, Turkey
 Bozdoğan, Olur
 Sarakap, Armenia, formerly known as Bozdogan
 Valens Aqueduct, Bozdoğan Kemeri, in Istanbul, Turkey

See also 
 Bozdoğan (surname)